Island Melanesia is a subregion of Melanesia in Oceania.

It is located east of New Guinea island, from the Bismarck Archipelago to New Caledonia.

See also

Archaeology and social history 
 Lapita culture
 Micronesian navigation
 Polynesian navigation

Human geography 
 East Melanesian Islands
 Near Oceania
 Remote Oceania

Languages 
 Central–Eastern Oceanic languages
 Oceanic languages
 Remote Oceanic languages
 Southern Oceanic languages

Nations 
 Bougainville
 Fiji
 New Caledonia
 Solomon Islands
 Vanuatu

References

Geography of Melanesia
Regions of Oceania
Geography of New Caledonia
Geography of Papua New Guinea
Geography of the Solomon Islands
Bismarck Archipelago
Louisiade Archipelago
Solomon Islands (archipelago)